Lövestad is a locality situated in Sjöbo Municipality, Skåne County, Sweden with 643 inhabitants in 2010.

References

External links 

 

Populated places in Sjöbo Municipality
Populated places in Skåne County